Cumberland Township is a township in Adams County, Pennsylvania, United States. The population was 7,033 at the 2020 census. In 1863, the American Civil War Battle of Gettysburg took place mainly in Cumberland Township, which surrounds the borough of Gettysburg on three sides.

Geography

Demographics

As of the census, there were 6,300 people living in the township.  The population density was 171.0 people per square mile (66.0/km).  There were 2,365 housing units at an average density of 70.7/sq mi (27.3/km).  The racial makeup of the township was 93.84% White, 2.54% African American, 0.30% Native American, 1.45% Asian, 0.02% Pacific Islander, 1.05% from other races, and 0.80% from two or more races. Hispanic or Latino of any race were 2.15% of the population.

There were 2,231 households, out of which 27.1% had children under the age of 18 living with them, 59.7% were married couples living together, 8.6% had a female householder with no husband present, and 28.8% were non-families. 24.9% of all households were made up of individuals, and 12.3% had someone living alone who was 65 years of age or older.  The average household size was 2.38 and the average family size was 2.83.

In the township the population was spread out, with 20.6% under the age of 18, 6.0% from 18 to 24, 23.6% from 25 to 44, 28.8% from 45 to 64, and 20.9% who were 65 years of age or older.  The median age was 45 years. For every 100 females, there were 94.1 males.  For every 100 females age 18 and over, there were 92.1 males.

The median income for a household in the township was $48,580, and the median income for a family was $54,890. Males had a median income of $41,250 versus $25,909 for females. The per capita income for the township was $22,782.  About 3.7% of families and 5.5% of the population were below the poverty line, including 5.6% of those under age 18 and 2.2% of those age 65 or over.

See also
Cumberland (disambiguation), for other places named "Cumberland"

References

External links

 Cumberland Township official website

Populated places established in 1733
Townships in Adams County, Pennsylvania
Townships in Pennsylvania